Jason Horton (born February 16, 1980) is a former American football cornerback. He was signed by the Toronto Argonauts as an undrafted free agent in 2003. He played college football at North Carolina A&T.

Horton was also a member of the Green Bay Packers, Houston Texans, Kansas City Chiefs, Calgary Stampeders and Virginia Destroyers.

External links
Just Sports Stats

1980 births
Living people
Players of American football from North Carolina
American football cornerbacks
American players of Canadian football
Canadian football defensive backs
North Carolina Tar Heels football players
North Carolina A&T Aggies football players
Toronto Argonauts players
Green Bay Packers players
Houston Texans players
Kansas City Chiefs players
Oakland Raiders players
Virginia Destroyers players